Muxuyuan (Ming Xiaoling Mausoleum) Station is a railway station on Line 2 of Nanjing Metro. It started operations on 28 May 2010 along with the rest of Line 2.

Statistics

Decorations
Since Line 2 of the Nanjing Metro is centered on Chinese traditional festivals, the theme of this station's decorations is the Qixi Festival. At , It features the largest painting area of any Line 2 station, if not the entire Nanjing Metro system. Several traditional romance stories can be seen if one looks up at the ceiling, such as Niulang and Zhinü, Houyi and Chang'e and so on.

In April 2013, the station became the second in the Nanjing Metro system, after , to install a set of "musical stairs" leading up from the station platform. The stairs, christened "music stairs", were intended to play chords from the Butterfly Lovers' Violin Concerto whenever passengers would use the stairs. However, repeated wear and tear on the steps has caused loss of this unique functionality.

Gallery

Around the station
 Ming Xiaoling Mausoleum
 Nanjing Botanical Garden, Memorial Sun Yat-Sen

References

Railway stations in Jiangsu
Nanjing Metro stations
Railway stations in China opened in 2010